The Decauville railway at Láchar was an  long narrow-gauge railway with a gauge of  from Íllora-Láchar railway station via the Eiffel Bridge to the sugar mill in Láchar.

Route 

It ended at a turntable at the western end of the site.

History 
Growing sugar beets and producing sugar from them caused a major structural change in the Vega de Granada at the end of the 19th century. The landlord and businessman Julio Quesada y Piedrola, Duke of San Pedro de Galatino, Count of Benalúa and Señorío de Láchar planned and contracted the sugar mill and the industrial railway during or shortly after the Exposition Universelle (1889) in Paris. It was put into service in 1890.

King Alfonso XIII, a personal friend of the Count of Benalúa, visited and used the railway to travel to the sugar factory. It was closed in 1926, due to the crisis in the sugar industry.

Rolling stock 
There were two Decauville steam locomotives and 46 waggons of different types.

External links 
 Routa del Señorío de Lachar

References 

Narrow gauge railways in Spain
Railway lines opened in 1890
Railway lines closed in 1926
600 mm gauge railways